was the 4th Chief of Staff of the Joint Staff of the Japan Self-Defense Forces. A four-star General from the Japan Air Self-Defense Force, Iwasaki was the highest-ranking military officer in Japan and ranked third in the overall chain of command (after the Prime Minister and the Minister of Defense).

Career

Iwasaki was born and raised in Iwate Prefecture and attended Morioka Third High School. He attended the National Defense Academy of Japan, graduating into the Japan Air Self-Defense Force in 1975. He is trained to fly the McDonnell Douglas F-15 Eagle, Japan's primary jet fighter.

In August 1991, then-Lieutenant Colonel Iwasaki took command of the 201st Tactical Fighter Squadron. In December 1997, then-Colonel Iwasaki took command of the 7th Air Wing. In January 2001, then-Major General Iwasaki took command of the 2nd Air Wing.

In December 2010, General Iwasaki became the 31st Chief of Staff of the Japan Air Self-Defense Force. As Chief of Staff, he spearheaded the effort to procure the fifth generation Lockheed Martin F-35 Lightning II.

In January 2012, General Iwasaki was promoted to be Chief of Staff of the Joint Staff, becoming the highest-ranking official in the Japan Self-Defense Forces. He replaced GSDF General Ryuichi Ariki, and his Vice Chief of Staff was Kōichi Isobe. He has presided over a number of significant national security issues, including the renewed Senkaku Islands dispute and the possible revision of Article 9 of the Japanese Constitution (following the Liberal Democratic Party's landslide electoral victory in December 2012).

In 2015 he was appointed an honorary Officer in the Military Division of the Order of Australia, for his role in enhancing defence engagement and practical co-operation between Australia and Japan.

Awards
  Legion of Merit (Commander)
  - Honorary Officer of the Order of Australia (Military Division)

Defensive memorial cordons
  5th Defensive Memorial Cordon 
  2nd Defensive Memorial Cordon
  3rd Defensive Memorial Cordon
  9th Defensive Memorial Cordon with 1 silver cherry blossom 
  11th Defensive Memorial Cordon
  13th Defensive Memorial Cordon 
  14th Defensive Memorial Cordon 
  19th Defensive Memorial Cordon with 1 silver cherry blossom 
  20th Defensive Memorial Cordon 
  21st Defensive Memorial Cordon
  22nd Defensive Memorial Cordon
  26th Defensive Memorial Cordon with 2 gold cherry blossoms 
  32nd Defensive Memorial Cordon
  33rd Defensive Memorial Cordon
  36th Defensive Memorial Cordon
  41st Defensive Memorial Cordon with 2 silver cherry blossoms

References

External links

Living people
1953 births
Military personnel from Iwate Prefecture
National Defense Academy of Japan alumni
Chiefs of Staff of the Japan Air Self-Defense Force
Honorary Officers of the Order of Australia